A milkshake machine or drink mixer is a kind of countertop electric mixer used to make milkshakes, flavored milk, frappés, and other blended beverages. Milkshake machines are generally used in ice cream stores and fast food restaurants, and are not common as domestic appliances, where blenders are typically used instead.

Overview

A milkshake machine consists of a stand for an electric motor and a removable cup, a "malt cup". The motor is connected to a vertical rod at the bottom of which is an small agitator of wavy metal or plastic. The cup is placed so that the agitator is submerged, and sits on the floor of the stand, or on a small bracket. The malt cup is a flared cup, usually of stainless steel.

History
Manual, crank-driven milkshake machines were introduced by James Tufts in 1884, under the name Lightning Shaker.

The modern top-driven electric milkshake machine was invented by Frederick J. Osius in 1910, and commercialized by his Hamilton Beach company under the name Cyclone Drink Mixer.

Hamilton Beach continues to be a major brand, as are Waring and Proctor Silex.

See also
 Milk frother
 Immersion blender
 Mixer (appliance)
 Drink mixer

Notes

Food preparation appliances
Products introduced in 1910